This list includes properties and districts listed on the National Register of Historic Places in Greene County, North Carolina. Click the "Map of all coordinates" link to the right to view a Google map of all properties and districts with latitude and longitude coordinates in the table below.

Current listings

|}

See also

National Register of Historic Places listings in North Carolina
List of National Historic Landmarks in North Carolina

References

Greene County, North Carolina
Greene County